Upstairs/Downstairs is the second and final full-length album by The Ergs!.

Artwork
One version of the cover had a slash upstairs / downstairs on the artwork with words inside two arrows on the stairs, but other versions remove the slash and are simply upstairs downstairs inside the two arrows.

Track listing
"Your Cheated Heart" – 0:55
"2nd Foundation" – 2:09
"Boston, Mass." – 0:48
"The Clocks, The Clocks" – 1:03
"It'll Be OK" – 2:39
"Bike Shoppe" – 2:14
"Fluorescent Stars" – 1:25
"See Him Again" – 3:08
"Things I Could Never Find A Way To Say" – 0:32
"Hysterical Fiction" – 2:02
"Stinking Of Whiskey Blues" – 3:38
"Trouble In River City" – 1:33
"Girls Of The Market Square" – 2:30
"Books About Miles Davis" – 2:32
"Upstairs/Downstairs" – 18:09

Personnel
The Ergs
Mike Yannich – Drums/Vocals
Jeff Schroek – Guitar/Vocals
Joe Keller – Bass Guitar

Additional personnel
Mike Catalano – Guitar
Craig Mileski – Keyboards
Jason Nixon – Bass
Miranda Taylor – Drums

Reception

Brian Schultz of Punknews.org rated the album three out of five stars. Stuart Mason of Allmusic rated it three and a half out of five.

References

2007 albums
The Ergs! albums
Albums produced by Conrad Uno